Blåhøi is a mountain in Lesja Municipality in Innlandet county, Norway. Other surrounding mountains include Svarthøi to the northwest and Vangshøi to the southeast.

See also
List of mountains of Norway

References

Mountains of Innlandet
Lesja